Phytometra apicata is a moth in the family Erebidae described by William Barnes and James Halliday McDunnough in 1916. It is found in North America.

The MONA or Hodges number for Phytometra apicata is 8482.

References

Further reading
 
Lafontaine, J. Donald, & Schmidt, B. Christian (2010). "Annotated check list of the Noctuoidea (Insecta, Lepidoptera) of North America north of Mexico". ZooKeys. vol. 40, 1-239.

External links
Butterflies and Moths of North America

Moths described in 1916